Klappert is a surname. Notable people with the surname include:

Peter Klappert (born 1942), American poet
Marianne Klappert, German politician, see List of Social Democratic Party of Germany members

See also
Klapper
Klapp